Schmidts Katze is a 2015 German comedy film directed by Marc Schlegel. It was one of eight films shortlisted by Germany to be their submission for the Academy Award for Best Foreign Language Film at the 88th Academy Awards, but it lost out to Labyrinth of Lies.

Cast

 Michael Lott as Werner Schmidt
 Christiane Seidel as Sybille
 Michael Kessler as Uwe
 Franziska Traub as Inge
 Alexander E. Fennon as Frehse
 Volker Michalowski as Polizist Plötzke
 Georg Alfred Winter as Polizist Gerber

References

External links
 

2015 films
2015 comedy films
2010s German-language films
German comedy films
2010s German films